Kohekohe (Dysoxylum spectabile) is a medium-sized tree in the Meliaceae family, native to New Zealand. It is found in lowland and coastal forests throughout most of the North Island and also occurs in the Marlborough Sounds in the north of the South Island.

The name kohekohe is derived from Proto-Polynesian *kofe meaning a type of bamboo (ʻohe); its thickening leaf stem bases may have reminded early Polynesian settlers to those of the ʻohe. A fairly close relative of true mahogany (Swietenia), it is also called New Zealand mahogany, because its wood is light, strong and polishes to a fine red colour.

Kohekohe is notable for having characteristics normally associated with trees growing in the tropics, for example, its flowers and fruit grow directly from the trunk or branches (known as cauliflory), and it has large, glossy, pinnate leaves up to 40 cm in length. The inflorescences of kohekohe may be up to 30 cm long, and the flowers produce a strong sweet smell.  The large green fruit takes around fifteen months to ripen.  The fruit contains three or four cells containing a seed encased in a fleshy orange-coloured aril. The tree does not flower in the year while the fruit capsules are maturing, and therefore individual trees may flower in alternate years.

Kohekohe forest used to be common in damp coastal and lowland areas in the North Island, but these forests have mostly disappeared because the land was used for settlement or they were browsed by possums. Studies have shown rapid recovery in kohekohe canopy after implementation of possum control.

Māori boiled the bark in water and drank it as a tonic. The wood was used for building canoes but is soft and not as durable as other woods and tends to rot quickly. It is valued for carving. Kohekohe was probably the dominant vegetation cover on Kapiti Island before it was cleared in the early 19th century for cultivation and farming. The kohekohe forest on Kapiti is recovering after possums were eradicated in 1986.

Gallery

Taxonomy 
Kohekohe was first described by Georg Forster in 1786 as Trichilia spectabilis, and was transferred to the genus, Dysoxylum, in 1864 by Joseph Hooker.

References

External links 

 
 Dysoxylum spectabile: Images and occurrence data from GBIF

Dysoxylum
Cauliflory
Trees of New Zealand
Trees of mild maritime climate
Taxa named by Georg Forster
Taxa described in 1786